Zheleznogorsk, is a closed town in Krasnoyarsk Krai, Russia, with a developed nuclear industry. The town has a population of

History
The town was formerly known as Krasnoyarsk-26.

It was established in 1950 for the production of weapons-grade plutonium. The history of the town and the associated defense complex are intertwined. In 1959, the government created the eastern office of OKB-1 (later known as NPO PM) under the supervision of M. F. Reshetnev. Defense plants included nuclear facilities built within caverns excavated in the granite mountain on the northern edge of the city, as well as space research enterprises.

It was a closed city until President Boris Yeltsin decreed in 1992 that such places could use their historical names. Before then, the town had not appeared on any official maps. As is the tradition with Soviet towns containing secret facilities, "Krasnoyarsk-26" is actually a P.O. Box number and implies that the place is located some distance from the city of Krasnoyarsk. The town was also known as Soctown, Iron City, the Nine, and Atom Town.

Administrative and municipal status
Within the framework of administrative divisions, it is, together with five rural localities, incorporated as the closed administrative-territorial formation of Zheleznogorsk—an administrative unit with the status equal to that of the districts. As a municipal division, the closed administrative-territorial formation of Zheleznogorsk is incorporated as Zheleznogorsk Urban Okrug.

Settlements under juridistion of "CATF Zheleznogorsk" include:  Zheleznogorsk, Dodonovo, Podgorny, Novy Put, Тартат and Shivera.

Geography
Zheleznogorsk is located 35 km north of Krasnoyarsk, in the foothills of the Atamanovsky ridge, the spurs of the Sayan Mountains. The climate of the city, as in Krasnoyarsk, is Dfb according to Köppen. The average annual temperature is 2.2 °C (36 °F). The city is located far from the southern border of permafrost. Mixed forests grow in the city itself, with a predominance of conifers, especially in mountainous areas.

Economy

Zheleznogorsk is the location of the Krasnoyarsk Mining and Chemical Combine, a combine that played a significant role in the early Russian nuclear weapons production campaigns.

Zheleznogorsk is also the location for the production of plutonium, electricity and district heat using graphite-moderated water-cooled reactors. The last reactor was shut down permanently in April 2010. It is the location of a military reprocessing facility and for a Russian commercial nuclear-waste storage facility.

A significant employer in the city is ISS Reshetnev (Reshetnev Information Satellite Systems), Russia's largest satellite manufacturer and the prime developer of the GLONASS program.

In popular culture
Krasnoyarsk-26 is the setting of a key episode in the 2001 novel The Sky Is Falling by Sidney Sheldon.

References

Notes

Sources

External links

Official website of Zheleznogorsk 
Zheleznogorsk Business Directory

Cities and towns in Krasnoyarsk Krai
Closed cities
Nuclear weapons program of the Soviet Union
Naukograds
Populated places on the Yenisei River
Zheleznogorsk Urban Okrug, Krasnoyarsk Krai
Renamed localities in Russia